Kayes Cercle is an administrative subdivision of the Kayes Region of Mali.  Its seat is the city of Kayes, which is also the capital of its Region and its largest city.  The Cercle is further divided into  Communes. The city of Kayes is subdivided into Urban Communes and Wards (French: Quartiers).  Kayes Cercle's population in 2009 was 513,362.

Communes

References

Cercles of Mali